U.S. Route 93 (US 93) is a north–south U.S. Highway in the U.S. state of Idaho.

Route description
US 93 enters southern Idaho from Nevada, immediately north of the border casino town of Jackpot. Heading northbound in Twin Falls County, it passes through Rogerson and Hollister towards Twin Falls. West of the city, US-93 turns and runs east–west for a few miles, parallel with US-30. This section is Pole Line Road; the highway returns to its north–south orientation in Twin Falls at the intersection of Pole Line Road and Blue Lakes Boulevard.

Further north in Shoshone, US-93 connects with the southern terminus of State Highway 75, the former route of US-93 to Ketchum and over Galena Summit ( above sea level) to Stanley and Clayton. Present-day US-93 diverts in a northeasterly route to Richfield, Carey, the Craters of the Moon, and Arco. Between Shoshone and Arco, the highway runs concurrently with the east–west US-26, and also with US-20 between Carey and Arco.

From Arco, the highway turns northwest and climbs the Big Lost River valley through Mackay. Mackay Dam and reservoir are on the southwest side of the highway.

US-93 creates the northern terminus of State Highway 75 just south of Challis and takes over as the northern leg of the Salmon River Scenic Byway.

Continuing north, the US-93 runs along portions of the Lewis and Clark Trail. US-93 continues north, climbing the North Fork of the Salmon River into the Bitterroot Range, passing through the Salmon-Challis National Forest and Gibbonsville. West of the highway at the pass is the Lost Trail Powder Mountain ski area, with terrain in both states.

History
US-93 was established in 1926, initially using the modern-day route of SH-75 between Shoshone and Challis. The highway was re-aligned to its modern route via Arco in 1977, replacing an alternative route.

In 2010, the  Pole Line Road bypass around Twin Falls opened to traffic. US 93 was re-routed to the new bypass, while the old route was signed as US 93 Business.

Gallery

Major intersections

See also

 List of U.S. Highways in Idaho
 List of highways numbered 93

References

External links

 Idaho Transportation Dept. – Milepost log – U.S. 93
 Roadcams – U.S. 93
 David Rumsey Map Collection – Historic road map (1937) – Idaho, Montana, Wyoming – Texaco (Rand McNally)
 Idaho highway map (1956) – Shell (H.M. Gousha)

 Idaho
93
Transportation in Twin Falls County, Idaho
Transportation in Jerome County, Idaho
Transportation in Lincoln County, Idaho
Transportation in Blaine County, Idaho
Transportation in Butte County, Idaho
Transportation in Custer County, Idaho
Transportation in Lemhi County, Idaho